Elizabeth Elliott (born in Fort Worth, Texas as Linda Elliott) is the pseudonym for American romance novel author Linda Crippes. All of her novels are published by Bantam Books, now owned by Random House. In addition to writing, she has held various management positions with Fortune 500 companies and worked as a management consultant for a variety of smaller businesses, specializing in information technology. She lives in Minnesota with her husband. She is a recipient of the RITA Award.

Awards
1993 – Romance Writers of America Golden Heart Award
1996 – RITA Award in the category of Best First Book for The Warlord

Bibliography
 The Warlord (1995)
 Scoundrel (1996)
 Betrothed (1996)
 When You Wish (1997) (anthology)
 "The Dark Knight" (2012)

References and sources

External links

Elizabeth Elliott Official website
Random House Author Spotlight
All About Romance Interview
The Romance Reader Review

American romantic fiction writers
Living people
People from Fort Worth, Texas
RITA Award winners
Year of birth missing (living people)